Lange Glacier is a glacier flowing into the west side of Admiralty Bay close south of Admiralen Peak, King George Island, in the South Shetland Islands, Antarctica. It was charted by the French Antarctic Expedition, 1908–10, under Jean-Baptiste Charcot, and was named by the UK Antarctic Place-Names Committee in 1960 for Alexander Lange (1860–1922), a Norwegian pioneer of modern steam whaling in the South Shetland Islands in 1905–6, and commander of the Admiralen.

See also
 List of glaciers in the Antarctic
 Glaciology

References

 

Glaciers of King George Island (South Shetland Islands)